Zhangjiang Subdistrict is a subdistrict and the county seat of Taoyuan County in Hunan, China. The subdistrict was incorporated from a part of the former Zhangjiang Town in 2017. The subdistrict has 13 villages and 13 communities under its jurisdiction, its seat is at North Yufu Rd.()

Subdivisions

References

Taoyuan County
County seats in Hunan